Beth Louise Mallard (born 5 August 1981) is a former New Zealand rugby union player. She was in the squad that won the 2006 Women's Rugby World Cup.

Mallard began her rugby career at Wellington Girls' College, she is the daughter of former Labour MP Trevor Mallard.

Mallard made her provincial debut for Otago in 1999 against Southland in Invercargill. She made her 50th appearance for Otago in 2010. She made her international debut for the Black Ferns on 4 September 2006 against Samoa at Edmonton.

In 2007, She was named in the Black Ferns squad that played Australia in a two test series. She featured in the two tests against England in 2009.

Mallard graduated with a doctorate in physiology in 2011 from the University of Otago.

References

External links
Black Ferns Profile

1981 births
Living people
New Zealand women's international rugby union players
New Zealand female rugby union players
Place of birth missing (living people)
University of Otago alumni
Rugby union props